Back at the Barnyard (also known as Barnyard: The Series) is an American CGI animated television series based on the 2006 film Barnyard. The second and final installment in the Barnyard franchise, the series aired from September 29, 2007, to September 18, 2010, on Nickelodeon and Nicktoons for two seasons. The show was a co-production between Omation Animation Studio and  Nickelodeon Animation Studio. The remaining episodes aired from September 12 to November 12, 2011, on Nicktoons.

Plot 
Following the events of the film, the series' plot generally revolves around Otis and his friends going on various misadventures and trying to keep their anthropomorphism a secret from humans.

Episodes

Characters 

Otis (voiced by Chris Hardwick)
Abby (voiced by Leigh-Allyn Baker)
Pip (voiced by Jeffrey Garcia) 
Noreen "Nora" Beady (voiced by Maria Bamford)
Farmer Buyer (voiced by Fred Tatasciore)
Eugene "Snotty Boy" Goldner (voiced by Steve Oedekerk)
Nathaniel Randall "Nathan" Beady III (voiced by Steve Oedekerk)
Pig (voiced by Tino Insana)
Freddy (voiced by Cam Clarke)
Peck (voiced by Rob Paulsen)
Duke (voiced by Dom Irrera)
Bessy (voiced by Wanda Sykes)

Video game 

Back at the Barnyard: Slop Bucket Games (released in European regions under the name Back at the Barnyard: Barnyard Games) is an action video game released by THQ in 2008 for the Nintendo DS. It received generally negative reviews from critics, with a score of 49 from review aggregator Metacritic.

References

External links 

 Press Release
 Mark Beam - Character Design / Associate Producer
 
 

Back at the Barnyard
Nicktoons
2000s Nickelodeon original programming
2010s Nickelodeon original programming
2000s American animated television series
2010s American animated television series
2000s American children's comedy television series
2010s American children's comedy television series
2007 American television series debuts
2011 American television series endings
American children's animated comedy television series
American computer-animated television series
American sequel television series
Animated television shows based on films
English-language television shows
Television series about cattle
Television series created by Steve Oedekerk
Television shows set in Arizona
YTV (Canadian TV channel) original programming
Internet memes introduced in 2016